Gometz-le-Châtel is a commune in the Essonne department of France. It is a southern suburb of Paris, 25 km from the center of Paris.

Geography
This village is near Les Ulis, Bures-sur-Yvette, Gif-sur-Yvette and Gometz-la-Ville, along the old road from Paris to Chartres, crossing the Hurepoix.

Climate

Gometz-le-Châtel has a oceanic climate (Köppen climate classification Cfb).

History
 This is a very old village, known since 1068.
 A train line was built between Paris to Chartres via Gallardon, at the beginning of the 20th century, with a station at Gometz-le-Châtel. It was used from 1931 to 1939, but there is no traffic nowadays. Paris RER, B line, can be used to go there by train Bures-sur-Yvette (Paris RER) or La Hacquinière (Paris RER).
 An experimental Aérotrain was built, from Gometz-le-Châtel to Limours, for a trial, from 1966 to 1977, a creation of Jean Bertin (railway engineer). This experiment was replaced by the TGV, operating currently.

Inhabitants of Gometz le Châtel are called Castelgometziens.

Places to see
 Saint-Clair's Church built during the 10th Century.
 Viaduc des Fauvette
 La Fontaine Miraculeuse

Personalities
 Charles Peguy (French author) lived here for a time.

See also
Communes of the Essonne department

References

External links
*Official website 

Mayors of Essonne Association 

Communes of Essonne